Omega Boötis, its name Latinized from ω Boötis, is a solitary, orange-hued star in the northern  constellation of Boötes. It is a dim star but visible to the naked eye with an apparent visual magnitude of +4.82. The star is drifting further away with a radial velocity of +13 km/s.

This star is three billion years old with a stellar classification of K4 III, matching an evolved K-type giant star that has consume the supply of hydrogen at its core. It has an estimated 1.65 times the mass of the Sun and has expanded to 39 times the Sun's radius. The star is radiating 355 times the Sun's luminosity from its photosphere at an effective temperature of about 3,962 K.

References

External links
 
 

K-type giants
Bootis, Omega
Boötes
Durchmusterung objects
Bootis, 41
133124
073568
5600